A trident  is a three-pronged spear. It is used for spear fishing and historically as a polearm.

The trident is the weapon of Poseidon (Greek) or Neptune (Roman), the god of the sea in classical mythology. Other sea deities such as Amphitrite or Triton were also often depicted with a trident in classical art. Later, tridents were used in medieval heraldry, sometimes held by a merman or triton. In Hinduism, it is the weapon of Shiva and is known as a trishula (Sanskrit for "triple-spear").

Etymology

The word "trident" comes from the Latin word  or : tri meaning "three" and dentes meaning "teeth", referring specifically to the three prongs, or "teeth", of the weapon.

The Greek term does not imply three of anything specific, and is vague about the shape, thus the assumption it was originally of "trident" form has been challenged.

Latin  also means "trident".

The Sanskrit name for the trident, trishula, is a compound of tri त्रि for "three" and śūla शूल for "thorn", calling the trident's three prongs "thorns" rather than "teeth" or dant in Sanskrit, making the word "Tridant" for trident.

Mythology and art

Poseidon 

The trident is associated with the sea god Poseidon. This divine instrument is said to have been forged by the cyclopes.

Poseidon struck a rock with his trident, causing a sea (or a saltwater spring, called the Erechtheis) to appear nearby on the Acropolis in Athens. And according to Roman sources, Neptune struck the earth with the trident to produce the first warhorse.

Poseidon, as well as being the god of the sea, was also known as the "Earth Shaker", believed to cause earthquakes; some commentators have extrapolated that the god would have used the trident to cause them, possibly by striking the earth.

In the Renaissance artist Gian Bernini's sculpture Neptune and Triton (1622–23), Neptune is posed holding a trident turned downwards, and is thought to reenact a scene from Aeneid or Ovid's Metamorphoses where he is calming the waves to aid Aeneas's ships.

Other sea divinities 

In later Greek and Roman art and literature, other sea deities and their attendants have been depicted holding the trident.

Poseidon's consort Amphitrite is often identified by some marine attribute other than a trident, which she never carries according to some scholars, though other commentators have disagreed.

Turning to the retinue or a train of beings which follow the sea deities (the marine thiasos) the Tritons (mermen) may be seen bearing tridents. Likewise, the Old Man of the Sea (halios geron) and the god Nereus are seen holding tridents. Tritons, other mermen, and the Nereides can also carry rudders, oars, fish, or dolphins.

Oceanus normally should not carry a trident, allowing him to be clearly distinguished from Poseidon. However, there is conflation of the deities in Romano-British iconography, and examples exist where the crab-claw headed Oceanus also bears a trident. Oceanus holding a trident has been found on Romano-British coinage as well.

Some amorini have been depicted carrying tiny tridents.

The trident is even seen suspended like a pendant on a dolphin in Roman mosaic art.

Hindu mythology 
In Hindu legends and stories Shiva, the Hindu god uses a trishula as his principal weapon. The trident is also said to represent three gunas mentioned in Indian Vedic philosophy namely sāttvika, rājasika, and tāmasika. The goddess Kali is sometimes portrayed with a trident as well.

A weapon of South-East Asian (particularly Thai) depiction of Hanuman, a character of Ramayana.

Miscellaneous 
In religious Taoism, the trident represents the Taoist Trinity, the Three Pure Ones. In Taoist rituals, a trident bell is used to invite the presence of deities and summon spirits, as the trident signifies the highest authority of Heaven.

A fork Jewish priests (Kohanim) used to take their portions of offerings.

In heraldry within the UK, the trident is often held by the figure identified as either a Neptune or a triton, or a merman.

The trident held up by an arm is depicted on some coats-of-arms.

Use

Fishing
In Ancient Greece, the trident was employed as a harpoon for spearing large fish, especially tuna fishing.

Tridents used in modern spear-fishing usually have barbed tines, which trap the speared fish firmly. In the Southern and Midwestern United States, gigging is used for harvesting suckers, bullfrogs, flounder and many species of rough fish.

Agriculture 
It has been used by farmers as a decorticator to remove leaves, seeds and buds from the stalks of plants such as flax and hemp. A form of trident is used by the gardians in the Camargue of southern France for herding cattle.

Combat
In Ancient Rome tridents ( or ) were used by a type of gladiator called a retiarius or "net fighter". The retiarius was traditionally pitted against a secutor, and cast a net to wrap his adversary and then used the trident to fight him.

Tridents were also used in medieval heraldry 

The trident, known as dangpa, is used as a weapon in the 17th- to 18th-century systems of Korean martial arts.

Modern symbolism

The glyph or sigil of the planet Neptune (♆), which alludes to the trident, is used in astronomy and astrology.

Political 

 The Tryzub in the Coat of Arms of Ukraine, adopted in 1918 (in a reinterpretation of a medieval emblem which is traced to the Volodymyr the Great, but may likely depicted a Algiz (also Elhaz) Viking rune that was introduced by Olga of Kyiv).
 The national and presidential flags of Barbados.
 The "forks of the people's anger", adopted by the Russian anti-Soviet revolutionary organization, National Alliance of Russian Solidarists (NTS).
 Britannia, the personification of Great Britain usually depicted to hold a trident.

Civilian use 
 The symbol for Washington and Lee University.
 The symbol (since June 2008) for the athletic teams (Tritons) at the University of Missouri–St. Louis.
 Sparky the Sun Devil, the mascot of Arizona State University, holds a trident. (ASU recently redesigned its trident as a stand-alone symbol.)
 The trident was used as the original cap insignia and original logo for the Seattle Mariners.
 An element on the flag of the Sea Shepherd Conservation Society.
 The Maserati logo.
 Club Méditerranée.
 The Hawker Siddeley Trident, a 1960s British three-engine jet airliner.
 The Tirreno–Adriatico cycle race trophy.
 The exterior of the World Trade Center used three-pronged decorative and structural elements at its base, commonly referred to as "tridents".

Military insignia 

 The emblem of the Hellenic Navy
 The emblem of the Cyprus Navy
 The insignia of Nepal Army
 With Poseidon in the 31st Brigade.
 The symbol of the Swedish Coastal Rangers, Kustjägarna.
 The United States Naval Special Warfare Command, and the Special Warfare insignia, particularly worn by members of the US Navy SEALs, and containing a trident representing the three aspects (Sea, Air, and Land) of SEAL special operations.
 Part of the golden-colored crest of the United States Naval Academy, which depicts a trident running vertically in its background.
 The ship's crests of 13 of the 18 Ohio-class submarines of the U.S. Navy prominently feature tridents, as both a symbol of maritime power, and in reference to their payloads of Trident D-5 missiles.
 The rating badge of the United States Coast Guard Marine Science Technician.
 The Tug Banner used by Mongolian Honor guards.
 The insignia of the German commando force, Kampfschwimmer.
 The rating badge of the United States Navy Ocean Systems Technician (OT)

Botanical nomenclature
A number of structures in the biological world are described as trident in appearance. Since at least the late 19th century the trident shape was applied to certain botanical shapes; for example, certain orchid flora were described as having trident-tipped lips in early botanical works. Furthermore, in current botanical literature, certain bracts are stated to have a trident-shape (e.g. Douglas-fir).

Gallery

See also

 Bident
 Eighteen Arms of Wushu
 Leister
 Military fork
 Pitchfork
 Sai
 Trishula
 Symbols of the Rurikids
 Trident (UK nuclear programme)
 Tug (banner)

Explanatory notes

References
Citations

Bibliography

  
 ; 
 

 
3 (number)
Spears
Ancient weapons
Fishing equipment
Greek sea gods
Mythological objects
Heraldic charges
Poseidon
Harpoons